The 1974 NBA World Championship Series was the championship round of the 1973–74 National Basketball Association (NBA) season. The Eastern Conference champion Boston Celtics defeated the Western Conference champion Milwaukee Bucks 4 games to 3 to win the NBA championship. This was the last time the Boston Celtics won a game 7 on the road until 2022, when the Boston Celtics defeated the Miami Heat in game 7 of the Eastern Conference Finals in Miami.

Background

Milwaukee Bucks

The Milwaukee Bucks returned to the NBA Finals after a three-year absence. Some of the cast from the 1971 championship team, such as Kareem Abdul-Jabbar (then Lew Alcindor), Jon McGlocklin, Bob Dandridge and the retiring Oscar Robertson returned for another title run; however, starting guard Lucius Allen, who averaged 17.6 points and 5.2 assists per game, was injured and did not play in the series. The Bucks eliminated the Los Angeles Lakers and the Chicago Bulls in five and four games, respectively, to advance to the Finals.

Boston Celtics

The Boston Celtics won a franchise record 68 games in the 1972–73 season, but a shoulder injury to John Havlicek quashed their title hopes, as they lost in seven games to the New York Knicks in the conference finals. Havlicek returned healthier for the 1973–74 season, and with Dave Cowens, Paul Silas and Jo Jo White entering the prime of their careers, the Celtics appeared poised for another title run. The Celtics, though winning 12 fewer games than the previous season, made the Finals, defeating the Buffalo Braves in six games before ousting the defending champion New York Knicks in five games.

Road to the Finals

Regular season series
These teams split the four-game season series, each winning once at home and on the road.

Series summary

Celtics win series 4–3

Game 1
Before the series started, Bucks point guard Lucius Allen would be lost for the series with a knee injury. In Game 1, the Celtics took advantage, harassing a 35-year-old Oscar Robertson and Allen's replacement, Ron Williams, into frequent turnovers. The Celtics took a 35–19 lead in the first quarter and never looked back on the way to a 98–83 win in Milwaukee. Kareem Abdul-Jabbar scored 35 points for the Bucks.

Game 2
Kareem Abdul-Jabbar scored 36 points, but more importantly, he took more of a role in running the Bucks' offense from the post, given their backcourt issues. His passing enabled Bob Dandridge to score 24 points.

On the defensive end, Abdul-Jabbar forced Dave Cowens into shooting 8-of-22 from the floor, including a block of a Cowens shot at the end of regulation to force overtime. The Bucks won 105–96 to even the series at a game apiece as it headed to Boston.

This game, played on April 30, was the last NBA Championship Series game played in the month of April to date.

Game 3
Sensing he was no match for Abdul-Jabbar in the paint, Dave Cowens decided to shoot more from the outside and scored 30 points, despite foul trouble that reduced him to 32 minutes of playing time. The Celtics' press also turned up the heat, forcing 11 first-quarter turnovers and helping Boston to a 21-point lead. With Cowens in foul trouble, seldom-used 7-footer Henry Finkel did an admirable job of spot defense on Abdul-Jabbar, who finished with 26 points. At game's end, the Bucks had turned the ball over 27 times, enough for a 95–83 Boston win.
This would be the last time the home team won in the series.

Game 4
With Ron Williams unable to handle the Celtics' press and shooting guard Jon McGlocklin nursing a sprained ankle, Bucks coach Larry Costello turned to little-used forward Mickey Davis for help in the backcourt. Davis at 6'7" presented matchup problems on offense for Jo Jo White, forcing Celtics coach Tom Heinsohn to assign Don Chaney to guard him. This enabled Oscar Robertson to more effectively set up the Bucks' offense.

Davis contributed 15 points and Kareem Abdul-Jabbar shredded the Celtics for 34 points and six assists from the low post. Milwaukee got the lead and kept it down the stretch for a 97–89 win at Boston Garden, thereby regaining homecourt advantage.

Game 5
The Celtics stole the homecourt advantage back with a 96–87 win in Milwaukee. John Havlicek and Dave Cowens scored 28 points each and Kareem Abdul-Jabbar scored 37 points. They would have a chance to close it out at home in Game 6.

Game 6
Dave Cowens got into foul trouble early and watched from the bench as Milwaukee took a 12-point lead in the first half. The Celtics were down by six late in the game, but they came back to force overtime. John Havlicek hit a long jumper to tie it at 86–86 with a little over a minute left, then Oscar Robertson was caught in a 24-second violation as time expired. In the first overtime, Milwaukee led 90-88 when Don Chaney got a steal and passed to Havlicek. Kareem Abdul-Jabbar was back on defense and forced Havlicek to take a pull-up jumper. Havlicek missed but got the long rebound and scored to send the game into a second overtime.

The second overtime was a furious nip-and-tuck affair, with the lead changing hands 11 times. After Bob Dandridge hit a pair of free throws, Havlicek, who had nine of his team's 11 points in the period, hit a short jumper from the baseline and was fouled by Dandridge. Havlicek hit the foul shot to put the Celtics up 93–92. Then, the frenzied exchange of baskets occurred with neither team leading by more than a point. Abdul-Jabbar hit a skyhook, then Havlicek hit a jumper. Oscar Robertson then scored the next two Bucks baskets, sandwiching a Jo Jo White jumper. Then, Havlicek scored again. On the next possession, Dave Cowens fouled Abdul-Jabbar in the lane, his sixth.

Mickey Davis put the Bucks up 100–99 with a basket with 24 seconds left. With the shot clock turned off, the Celtics worked for a final shot. Coach Tom Heinsohn screamed for a timeout, but with seven seconds left, Havlicek lofted a baseline rainbow over Abdul-Jabbar for a 101–100 lead.

The Bucks called for a timeout, and instead of setting up a play for Abdul-Jabbar, strangely decided to set up a play for a hobbled Jon McGlocklin where Abdul-Jabbar would set a pick from the high post. McGlocklin couldn't get free, however, and Davis was covered as he cut to the basket. Abdul-Jabbar, with the ball, moved to the right of the lane, dribbled to the baseline, and let fly a "sky-hook" from 17 feet which swished in with two seconds left. Jo Jo White put up a failed desperation heave, and that was it. The series was tied at three games apiece and going back to Milwaukee.
Havlicek ended with a game-high 36 points and Abdul-Jabbar led the Bucks with 34 points, including the game-winner.

Game 7
Home court advantage apparently meant very little in this series. The Celtics decided to abandon man-to-man defense and double and triple team Kareem Abdul-Jabbar, who still scored 26 points. This freed Dave Cowens more on the offensive end, as he hit 8 of 13 shots in the first half on his way to 28 points and 14 rebounds. John Havlicek added 16 as the Celtics cruised to an easy 102–89 win and their first title in the "post-Bill Russell era."

Aftermath
This was the Bucks' last appearance in the NBA Finals until 2021, winning their 2nd title and the first in 50 years. The Celtics returned to the finals two years later, winning their 13th title. They would go on to win 4 more titles in 8 Finals appearances since 1984 during the Larry Bird era.

Television
This was the first of 16 consecutive NBA Finals to be televised by CBS. It was the only NBA Finals called by Pat Summerall, best known for his work on the Masters Tournament and the National Football League. His partners on color commentary were Rick Barry and Hot Rod Hundley.

Team rosters

Boston Celtics

Milwaukee Bucks

See also
1974 NBA Playoffs
1973–74 NBA season

External links
NBA History

National Basketball Association Finals
NBA
NBA
Finals
NBA Finals
NBA Finals
Basketball competitions in Boston
Basketball competitions in Milwaukee
1970s in Milwaukee
NBA Finals
NBA Finals
NBA Finals